Jucilene Sales de Lima (born 14 September 1990) is a Brazilian athlete specialising in the javelin throw. She represented her country at the 2013 World Championships without qualifying for the final. In addition, she has won multiple medals on regional level, including the bronze at the 2015 Pan American Games. She competed at the 2020 Summer Olympics.

Her personal best in the event is 62.89 metres set in São Paulo in 2014. This is the current national record.

Competition record

References

1990 births
Living people
Brazilian female javelin throwers
Athletes (track and field) at the 2007 Pan American Games
Athletes (track and field) at the 2015 Pan American Games
World Athletics Championships athletes for Brazil
Pan American Games bronze medalists for Brazil
Pan American Games medalists in athletics (track and field)
South American Games silver medalists for Brazil
South American Games medalists in athletics
Competitors at the 2014 South American Games
Medalists at the 2015 Pan American Games
Athletes (track and field) at the 2020 Summer Olympics
Olympic athletes of Brazil
20th-century Brazilian women
21st-century Brazilian women